The Gloster Goral was a single-engined two-seat biplane built to an Air Ministry contract for a general-purpose military aircraft in the late 1920s.  It did not win the contest and only one was built.

Development
In 1927, driven by conflicting pressures of an ageing, World War I aircraft stock and the continual need for economy the Air Ministry was attracted by the idea of a general-purpose, multi-tasking machine which used many components from the large stocks of Airco DH.9A accumulated ten years before.  The result was Air Ministry specification 26/27, which also encouraged the use of a metal airframe for use overseas and of the abundant Napier Lion engine.  At least eight manufacturers responded and the Goral was Gloster's submission.

The Goral was an all-metal framed, fabric-covered biplane using DH9A wings of two-bay construction and of slight stagger, with parallel interplane struts.  There were ailerons on all wings.  The fuselage was oval in cross section and quite slim.  The wire-braced, round-tipped tailplane carried unbalanced elevators but the small fin carried a square-topped horn-balanced rudder.  The pilot sat under the wing trailing edge cutout, with the gunner behind him, his gun on a ring, mounted on the raised rear decking.  The undercarriage had a single axle strutted to the fuselage near the front spar and forward to the engine firewall.

The Goral was powered by an uncowled 425 hp (315 kW) Bristol Jupiter VIA   radial engine rather than the suggested Lion, driving a 12 ft (3.65 m) two-bladed fixed-pitch propeller.  The engine exhausts ran along  both sides of the lower fuselage from the Goral's long nose to below the gunner's cockpit.

The Goral was designed to allow the wings to be replaced with those from existing DH.9A stocks and the fuselage was constructed so that metal components could be replaced by wooden ones to optimise the possibility of overseas sales.  Nevertheless, these did not materialise, despite Argentinian interest as late as 1931.  At home, the Goral had been in competition for the Air Ministry contract almost immediately after its first flight in February 1927.  The competition winner was the Westland Wapiti.

The name
Goral is the local name for a goat-antelope, native to the mountains of Northern India, Nemorhaedus goral.

Specifications

See also

References

1920s British aircraft
Goral
Aircraft first flown in 1927
Biplanes
Single-engined tractor aircraft